Veikkausliiga is the premier division of Finnish football, the highest tier of the Finnish football league structure, comprising the top 12 clubs of the country. Its main sponsor is the Finnish national betting agency Veikkaus, hence the league's name. Veikkausliiga was founded in 1990; before that the top division was called Mestaruussarja (championship series) since 1930 which was an amateur or semi-professional league. Between 1908 and 1930 the championship was decided as a knock-out cup competition.

Structure 

During the 1990 and 1991 seasons the Veikkausliiga was played under the name "Futisliiga".

As with certain other cold-climate European countries, league matches in Finland are played in summer, with a schedule usually from April to October. The format and number of teams has changed frequently. As of 2020 there are 12 teams, which first face the other teams two times. After the two rounds, the league is divided into championship group (6 teams) and challenge group (6 teams), and both groups play a single series of five further matches. At the end of the season, the last team is relegated to Ykkönen, whose winner is promoted to Veikkausliiga, and the second last team plays a two-leg play-off versus the Ykkönen runner-up.

In 2010 the average annual salary with fringe benefits for a league player was 24,400 euros.  Veikkausliiga is a founding member of the European Professional Football Leagues association.

Clubs

The Veikkausliiga clubs in the 2023 season are presented in the table below. Number of seasons includes seasons played in Veikkausliiga and preceding Mestaruussarja and seasons of predecessor teams after season 2022. In the case of mergers, the seasons of the predecessor with the most seasons are counted.

Former clubs 

1) FC Jazz was formerly known as PPT (Porin Pallotoverit).
2) Kuusysi and Reipas merged their professional teams in 1996 to form FC Lahti. Kuusysi returned to Kakkonen in 2011 under the name Lahti Akatemia, while Reipas returned to Kolmonen one year later.
3) Tampere United was formed in 1998 after it inherited the place of FC Ilves. Tampere United was dissolved in 2011 and Ilves, which in the meantime had bought the place of KooVee in second division, got promoted back to the highest league in 2015.

Veikkausliiga 1990–present

Performance

Performance by club
The following clubs have won:

Finnish Championship Cup Competition (1908–1929) 
Mestaruussarja (1930–1989) 
Veikkausliiga (1990–present)

30 clubs have been Champions.

Top scorers

Individual all-time records

Most matches played

Last updated: 1 November 2022. Source: Veikkausliiga.com.

Most goals scored

Last updated: 1 November 2022. Source: Veikkausliiga.com.

See also
 Football Association of Finland
 List of foreign Veikkausliiga players

References

External links
 Official website
 Finland - List of League First Level Tables at RSSSF 
 Fixtures and Tables on aragon.ws 

 
1
Finland
Summer association football leagues
Sports leagues established in 1990
1990 establishments in Finland
Professional sports leagues in Finland

it:Campionato finlandese di calcio